Martin Mainer (born 31 October 1959 in Ostrava - Havířov) is a Czech artist and professor. He studied: VŠUP in Prague 1978 - 81, AVU 1981 - 85 (prof. A. Padrlík)

Career
In 1993 he received the Jindřich Chalupecký Award (the most prestigious Czech art prize). He worked in the Headlands Center for the Arts, and his paintings are, for example, in Amsterdam's Rijks Museum. Mainer participated in the IBCA 2005 in the National Gallery in Prague.

Since 1998 he has taught art at the Brno University of Technology, becoming a Professor, the highest Czech academic title, in 2005.  His students include Alfred Symůnek, Jan Karpíšek, and Jan Sytař.

Personal
Mainer has two daughters, Marie and Karolína.

External links
homepage

20th-century Czech painters
Czech male painters
21st-century Czech painters
21st-century male artists
People from Havířov
Living people
1959 births
20th-century Czech male artists